Jordan Rasmusson (born April 23, 1993) is an American politician serving as a member of the Minnesota House of Representatives from the 8A district. Elected in November 2020, he assumed office on January 6, 2021.

Education 
After graduating Fergus Falls High School in Fergus Falls, Minnesota, Rasmusson earned a Bachelor of Arts degree in government from Harvard University.

Career 
After graduating from Harvard, Rasmusson worked as a management consultant for McKinsey & Company. He later worked as an investment professional at Bain Capital before establishing the Rasmusson Group, a business and investment management firm. Rasmusson was elected to the Minnesota House of Representatives in November 2020 and assumed office on January 6, 2021.

References 

Living people
Harvard University alumni
People from Fergus Falls, Minnesota
Republican Party members of the Minnesota House of Representatives
McKinsey & Company people
Bain Capital people
1993 births